Senator Holton may refer to:

Hart Benton Holton (1835–1907), Maryland State Senate
Henry Dwight Holton (1838–1917), Vermont State Senate

See also
Samuel Holten (1738–1816), Massachusetts State Senate